Lip Service is a game show that aired on MTV from February 22, 1992  to January 3, 1993 and again from May 10, 1993 to December 17, 1994. It was hosted originally by Jay Mohr, who was followed in the position by John Ales. Both hosts were joined by a rap-style disc jockey and included Spinderella (from Salt 'N Pepa), Monie Love, and Yo! MTV Raps regular T-Money.

The game featured two teams from U.S. colleges and universities competed in a lip-sync contest. The high scoring team each round won a smaller prize, and the team that earned the most points won a vacation.

Gameplay

Deadly Medley
In the first round, players didn't know what songs would be played or the order in which they would appear. One player at a time, the players had to lip-sync to the songs. Their performance would earn a score of 1-10 from each of the three judges: one judge scoring on accuracy, a second on body mechanics (later changed to "sass"), and the third scoring overall performance.

Flip-Sync
For round two, a music video was shown. One player at a time, the contestants sang the vocals instead of the artist in the video. For this round, contestants were made aware of the song they would sing shortly before the taping of the round, and lyrics were provided. Scoring in each category was again 1–10.

Scratch Factor
In the final round, the teams each perform a rehearsed and choreographed lip-sync performance. The song was of the choosing ahead of time of each team. During the performance, the team had to react to whatever the DJ did to try and slip them up (such as scratching, playing the record backwards, speeding up or slowing down the song).

Scoring for this round was 1-20 (10-20 later). Instead of awarding a prize for this round, the grand prize was then awarded to the high-scoring team.

See also
 Great Pretenders
 Lip Sync Battle
 Puttin' on the Hits

References

Musical game shows
MTV game shows
1990s American game shows
1992 American television series debuts
1994 American television series endings